Whitemans Valley is a rural suburb of Upper Hutt located in the lower North Island of New Zealand. Situated roughly 4 kilometers south of the Upper Hutt city centre, the area has a variety of farms and lifestyle blocks.

The first settler to discover the valley was George Whiteman in 1846 while he was pig-hunting. Settlement in the valley was founded by the Whiteman family in 1871.

References

Suburbs of Upper Hutt